Atanas Arshinkov (born 8 April 1987) is a Bulgarian footballer who plays as a goalkeeper.

References

External links

Living people
1987 births
Bulgarian footballers
OFC Pirin Blagoevgrad players
FC Montana players
First Professional Football League (Bulgaria) players

Association football goalkeepers
Sportspeople from Blagoevgrad